John Kyme or Cayme (by 1491 – between 1546 and 1553) was an English politician.

He was a Member (MP) of the Parliament of England for Lewes in 1542.

References

15th-century births
16th-century deaths
English MPs 1542–1544